Alastor asiaticus is a species of wasp in the family Vespidae.

References

asiaticus
Insects described in 1895